The Gnome-Rhône 14M was a small 14-cylinder two-row air-cooled radial engine that was used on several French and German aircraft of World War II. While having the same appearance, number of pistons (14) and two-row layout typical of Gnome-Rhône radial engines, the 14M was built to a smaller frame intended to power a lighter class of aircraft. It was designed with lower displacement and power, smaller in size and with less weight compared to the larger, heavier Gnome-Rhône 14N and its well-known predecessor.

Variants
14M-00LH rotation, 
14M-01RH rotation identical to 14M-00
14M-04LH rotation, 
14M-05RH rotation identical to 14M-04
14M-06LH rotation, reduction gear 0.71:1
14M-07RH rotation identical to 14M-06
14M-08LH rotation, reduction gear 0.71:1
14M-09RH rotation identical to 14M-08

Applications

Specifications (14M-4)
(14M-5 identical except opposite rotation)

See also
 Pratt & Whitney R-1535 a comparable engine sometimes fitted as an alternative to the 14M on French designs

References

 

1930s aircraft piston engines
Aircraft air-cooled radial piston engines
14M